Birinci Quzanlı is a village in the municipality of Guzanly in the Aghdam District of Azerbaijan.

References

Populated places in Aghdam District